Television in Canada has many individual stations, networks, and systems.

National broadcast television networks

English
 CBC Television, a national public network owned by the Canadian Broadcasting Corporation (CBC).
 Citytv, a privately owned television network owned by Rogers Media, with stations in Quebec, Ontario, Manitoba, Saskatchewan, Alberta and British Columbia.
 CTV Television Network, a national private network (except for Newfoundland and Labrador and the territories) owned by Bell Media.
 Global Television Network, a national private network (except for Newfoundland and Labrador and the territories) owned by Corus Entertainment.

French
 Ici Radio-Canada Télé, a national public network owned by the CBC's French-language division Société Radio-Canada.
 TVA, a privately owned television network owned by Groupe TVA.

Multilingual
 Aboriginal Peoples Television Network, a broadcast television network with television stations in the three territories and cable network carried nationwide on cable and satellite. Programming focuses on Aboriginals. It operates in English, French and various Aboriginal languages.

Regional broadcast television systems

English
 CTV 2, a privately owned television system with stations in Ontario, Alberta, British Columbia, and Atlantic Canada. It is owned by Bell Media.
 Great West Television, a privately owned group of stations affiliated with CTV Two and Citytv in British Columbia.
 Yes TV, a group of religious three stations in Ontario and Alberta owned by Crossroads Christian Communications.
 indieNET, an arrangement CHCH (in Ontario), CHEK (in British Columbia), & CJON (in Newfoundland and Labrador), three independent broadcasters, have with Yes TV to sub-license some of Yes TV's programming

French
 Noovo, a privately owned television system based in Quebec owned by Bell Media.

Multilingual
 CFHD-DT, a privately owned multicultural station based in Montreal, using the on-air brand ICI (International Channel).
 OMNI, a group of five privately owned multicultural television stations in Ontario, Alberta and British Columbia owned by Rogers Media.

Defunct regional broadcast television systems
 A-Channel, a privately owned television system based in Alberta, Manitoba, and Toronto and owned by Craig Media.
 Baton Broadcast System, or BBS, a privately owned television system based in Ontario and Saskatchewan and owned by Baton Broadcasting.
 E!, a privately owned television system based in Quebec, Ontario, Alberta, and British Columbia and owned by Canwest.
 Joytv, a privately owned television system based in British Columbia and Manitoba and was owned by ZoomerMedia.
 Northern Television, similar in fashion to Great West Television, also in BC. Shared by two northern BC CBC Television affiliates.

Regional broadcast television stations

English
 CHCH-DT, using the on-air brand CHCH - a privately owned television station in Hamilton owned by Channel Zero which airs local news & movies.
 CHEK-DT, using the on-air brand CHEK - a privately owned television station in Victoria owned by CHEK Media Group.
 CHNU-DT, using the on-air brand Joytv - a privately owned religious television station in Vancouver owned by ZoomerMedia.
 CIIT-DT, using the on-air brand Faith TV - a privately owned religious television station in Winnipeg owned by ZoomerMedia.
 CJIL-DT, using the on-air brand The Miracle Channel - a privately owned Christian television station in Lethbridge, Alberta owned by The Miracle Channel Association.
 CJON-DT, using the on-air brand NTV - a privately owned television station in Newfoundland & Labrador owned by Stirling Communications International.

Community broadcast television stations

English
 CFSO-TV, Cardston, Alberta.
 CFTS-TV, Teslin, Yukon.
 CFTV-DT, Leamington, Ontario.
 CH5248, Neepawa, Manitoba.
 CHCO-TV, St. Andrews, New Brunswick.
 CHOB-TV, Hobbema, Alberta.
 CIHC-TV, Hay River, Northwest Territories.
 CIRE-TV, High Prairie, Alberta.
 CKER-TV, Kahnawake, Quebec
 VX9AMK, (using the on-air brand Star Ray TV), Toronto, Ontario.

French
 CHNE-TV, Chéticamp, Nova Scotia.
 CHMG-TV, Quebec City, Quebec.

Multilingual
 CIMC-TV, Arichat, Nova Scotia (English and French).
 CFHD-DT, A privately owned multicultural station based in Montreal, using the on-air brand ICI (International Channel/Canal International).

Educational television stations

English
 Citytv Saskatchewan, a privately owned channel in Saskatchewan owned by Rogers Communications. Broadcasts a mix of educational, children's, and entertainment programs. Not available over-the-air, only available through cable throughout the province.
 CTV 2 Alberta, a privately owned channel in Alberta owned by Bell Media. Airs a mix of educational and entertainment programming. Not available over-the-air (though two stations relayed its programming over-the-air under the former Access branding until they were shut down in August 2011), only available through cable throughout the province.
 Knowledge Network, a publicly owned educational station in British Columbia owned by the government of British Columbia. Limited availability over-the-air, but is available on cable throughout the province.
 TVOntario, a publicly owned educational station in Ontario owned by the government of Ontario. Available over-the-air and on cable throughout the province.

French
 CFTU-DT, an educational station in Quebec owned by a private consortium known as Savoir Media, consisting primarily of Quebec-based post-secondary institutions. Broadcasts educational programming in Montreal over-the-air, but is available on cable throughout the rest of the province.
 Télé-Québec, a publicly owned educational station in Quebec owned by the government of Québec. Available over-the-air and on cable throughout the province. (CIVM-DT Montreal)
 TFO, a publicly owned educational station in Ontario owned by the government of Ontario. Available on cable throughout the province, as well as in New Brunswick and Manitoba.

Analogue cable specialty television channels

English

 BNN Bloomberg
 CBC News Network
 CMT
 CP24
 CPAC
 CTV Comedy Channel
 CTV Drama Channel
 CTV Life Channel
 CTV News Channel
 CTV Sci-Fi Channel
 Discovery
 DTOUR
 E!
 Family
 Family Jr.
 Food Network Canada
 HGTV Canada
 The History Channel
 MTV
 Much
 OWN Canada
 OLN
 Showcase
 Slice
 Sportsnet
 Sportsnet 360
 Sportsnet East
 Sportsnet Ontario
 Sportsnet Pacific
 Sportsnet West
 Teletoon
 Treehouse
 TSN
 TSN1
 TSN2
 TSN3
 TSN4
 TSN5
 VisionTV
 W Network
 The Weather Network
 YTV

French
 Canal D
 Canal Vie
 CPAC (French feed)
 Elle Fictions
 Évasion
 Historia
 Ici ARTV
 LCN
 Max
 MétéoMédia
 RDI
 RDS
 RDS2
 RDS Info
 Séries+
 Télétoon
 TV5 Québec Canada
 Unis
 Vrak
 Z

Multicultural
 ATN Channel
 Fairchild TV
 Odyssey
 Talentvision
 TLN

Teleshopping channels (exempt)

English
 TSC

Provincial parliamentary channels

English
 Alberta Legislature (Alberta)
 Hansard TV (British Columbia)
 House of Assembly Channel (Newfoundland and Labrador)
 Legislative Assembly of New Brunswick Television Service
 Legislative Television (Nova Scotia)
 Ontario Parliament Network
 Saskatchewan Legislative Network

French
 Canal de l'Assemblée nationale (Quebec)

Premium television services

English
 Crave (Six multiplex channels)
 Crave 1
 Crave 2
 Crave 3
 Crave 4 (time-shifted feed of Crave 1)
 HBO Canada 1 (East)
 HBO Canada 2 (West)
 Starz Canada (Two multiplex channels)
 Starz Canada 1
 Starz Canada 2
 Super Channel (Four multiplex channels)
 Super Channel Fuse
 Super Channel Heart & Home
 Super Channel Vault
 Ginx eSports TV Canada

French
 Cinépop
 Super Écran (Four multiplex channels)
 Super Écran 1
 Super Écran 2
 Super Écran 3
 Super Écran 4

Multicultural
 ATN Aastha TV
 ATN Bangla

Pay-per-view services

English
 SaskTel PPV
 Shaw PPV
 Sportsnet PPV
 Vu!

French
 Canal Indigo
 TALC
 Vu!

Audio and/or text-only services
 AMI-audio (English)
 Broadcast News (English)
 Canal M (French)
 Real Estate Channel (English)
 Stingray Music

Digital specialty television channels

English

 ABC Spark
 Adult Swim
 AMI-tv
 Animal Planet
 AOV Adult Movie Channel
 ATN Cricket Plus
 ATN DD Sports
 BBC Earth
 BBC First
 beIN Sports
 Cartoon Network
 Commonwealth Broadcasting Network
 Cooking Channel
 Cottage Life
 Crime & Investigation
 Daystar Television Canada
 DejaView
 Discovery Science
 Discovery Velocity
 Disney Channel
 Disney Junior
 Disney XD
 Documentary Channel
 Dorcel TV Canada
 ESPN Classic
 EuroWorld Sport
 Exxxtasy TV
 FEVA TV
 Fight Network
 FX
 FXX
 Game+
 GameTV
 Global News: BC 1
 History2
 Hollywood Suite 70s Movies
 Hollywood Suite 80s Movies
 Hollywood Suite 90s Movies
 Hollywood Suite 00s Movies
 HPItv (Four multiplex channels)
 HPItv (flagship feed)
 HPItv Canada
 HPItv International
 HPItv West
 Investigation Discovery
 Lifetime
 Love Nature
 Magnolia Network
 Makeful
 Maleflixxx Television
 MovieTime
 MTV2
 Nat Geo Wild
 National Geographic
 NBA TV Canada
 Nickelodeon
 One
 OneSoccer
 OutTV
 Penthouse TV
 Playmen TV
 Red Hot TV
 REV TV Canada
 Rewind
 RFD-TV Canada
 Salt + Light Television
 Silver Screen Classics
 Skinemax HD
 Smithsonian Channel
 Sportsman Channel
 Sportsnet One
 Sportsnet Flames
 Sportsnet Oilers
 Sportsnet Canucks
 Sportsnet World
 Stingray Country
 Stingray Juicebox
 Stingray Loud
 Stingray Naturescape
 Stingray Now 4K
 Stingray Retro
 Stingray Vibe
 T+E
 Terror TV (launch TBD)
 The Cowboy Channel Canada
 The Cult Movie Network
 The News Forum
 The Rural Channel
 Toon-A-Vision
 Vertical TV
 Vixen TV
 Water Television Network
 Wild TV
 WildBrainTV
 Willow TV
 WWE Network
 XITE 4K
 XXX Action Clips Channel

French

 addikTV
 AMI-télé
 Avis de Recherche
 Casa
 Dorcel TV Canada
 Frissons TV
 Ici Explora
 Investigation
 La Chaîne Disney
 MOI ET CIE
 Natyf TV
 PalmarèsADISQ par Stingray
 Prise 2
 RDS2
 RDS Info
 Stingray Hits!
 Télémagino
 TVA Sports
 TVA Sports 2
 TVA Sports 3
 Yoopa
 Zeste

Multicultural

 Aaj Tak
 Abu Dhabi TV
 Afroglobal Television
 Al-Nahar TV
 Al-Nahar Drama
 Al Resalah
 All TV
 All TV K
 APTN
 ATN Aastha TV
 ATN ABP Sanjha
 ATN ARY Digital
 ATN B4U Movies
 ATN B4U Music
 ATN B4U Plus
 ATN Bangla
 ATN Brit Asia TV
 ATN Channel
 ATN Colors Bangla
 ATN Colors Marathi
 ATN Colors Rishtey
 ATN DD Bharati
 ATN DD India
 ATN DD News
 ATN DD Urdu
 ATN Food Food
 ATN Gujarati
 ATN IBC Tamil
 ATN Jaya TV
 ATN Life
 ATN Movies
 ATN MTV India
 ATN News
 ATN News 18
 ATN PM One
 ATN Punjabi
 ATN Punjabi 5
 ATN Punjabi News
 ATN Punjabi Plus
 ATN SAB TV
 ATN Sikh Channel
 ATN Sony Aath
 ATN Sony Max
 ATN Sony Max 2
 ATN Sony TV
 ATN SVBC
 ATN Tamil Plus
 ATN Times Now
 ATN Urdu
 ATN Zoom
 BBC Arabic
 CBN
 Canada Chinese TV
 Canada National TV
 CCCTV
 Chakde TV
 Channel Punjabi
 Channel Y
 ERT World
 First National
 FPTV
 FTV
 Fairchild TV
 Fairchild TV 2 HD
 Filmy
 Greek Music Channel
 Halla Bol!
 Gurbaani TV
 HRT Sat
 Hum TV
 Inuit TV
 The Israeli Network
 LS Times TV
 Mediaset Italia
 Mediaset TGCOM 24
 MEGA Cosmos
 Momo Kids
 Montreal Greek TV
 NGTV
 News Only
 New Tang Dynasty Television
 Odyssey
 Only Music
 OSN Ya Hala International
 Prime Asia TV
 ProSiebenSat.1 Welt
 PTC Punjabi
 Rawal TV
 Rotana Aflam
 Rotana Cinema
 Rotana Classic
 Rotana Clip
 Rotana Drama
 Rotana Khalijiah
 Rotana Mousica
 RTS Sat
 RTVi
 Sanjha TV
 Schlager TV
 SSTV
 Tamil One
 Tamil Vision
 Talentvision
 Telebimbi
 TeleNiños
 TET
 TLN
 Travelxp
 TVCentr International
 TVP Info
 Univision Canada
 Uvagut TV
 VGN TV
 Vanakkam TV
 Win HD Caribbean
 WOWtv
 Zee 24 Taas
 Zee Bangla
 Zee Bollywood
 Zee Cinema
 Zee Marathi
 Zee Punjabi
 Zee Salaam
 Zee Talkies
 Zee Tamil
 Zee TV Canada
 Zing

High-definition specialty television channels and pay-per-view services

Defunct Canadian specialty channels
 Action (September 7, 2001 - March 31, 2019)
 AIM Pay-Tv Corp. (February 1983 - c. summer 1984)
 Argent (February 21, 2005 - April 30, 2016)
 A.Side TV (October 1, 2009 - January 15, 2023)
 BBC Canada (September 7, 2001 - December 31, 2020)
 BBC Kids (November 5, 2001 - December 31, 2018)
 Bloomberg TV Canada (November 17, 2015- October 5, 2017)
 bpm:tv (September 7, 2001 - June 1, 2015)
 Bollywood Times (November 28, 2011 - January 2018)
 BookTelevision (September 2001 - February 2021)
 Breakaway PPV (unknown - 2010)
 Canucks TV
 Flames PPV
 Oilers PPV
 BuyNOW TV (summer 2014 - 2017)
 CBC Parliamentary Television Network (September 1979 - October 1992)
 C Channel (February 1983 - June 1983)
 Canadian Forces Radio and Television (unknown — April 2014)
 CityNews Channel (May 30, 2011 - June 30, 2013)
 Comedy Gold (September 7, 2001 - September 1, 2019)
 CoolTV (September 2003 - July 2008)
 Cosmopolitan TV (February 14, 2008 - September 30, 2019)
 Dream 2 (February 2011 - 2015)
 DealsTV (September 2014 - 2016/2017)
 Discovery Kids Canada (September 2001 - November 2009)
 Dusk (September 2001 - March 2012)
 Encore Avenue (October 1995 - March 2016)
 Edge TV (September 2001 - July 2003)
 Fashion Television (September 2001 - February 2021)
 Fine Living (September 2004 - October 2009)
 Fox Sports World Canada (September 2001 - May 2012)
 FYI (September 2001 - December 2019)
 G4 (September 7, 2001 - August 31, 2017)
 Global Reality Channel (July 2010 - November 2012)
 GolTV (November 1, 2005 - August 31, 2015)
 HSTN (August 2002 - October 2002)
 ichannel (September 7, 2001 - August 15, 2016)
 IDNR-TV (2006 - 2020)
 IFC  (August 15, 2001 - September 30, 2019)
 Iran TV Network (2006 - 2020)
 Leafs Nation Network (September 7, 2001 - August 31, 2022)
 Leonardo World (June 2005 - September 2007)
 M3 (October 5, 1998 - September 1, 2016)
 Melody Hits (October 2002 - April 28, 2013)
 Melody Aflam (January 2006 - April 28, 2013)
 Melody Drama (October 17, 2009 - April 28, 2013)
 Max Trax (unknown - October 2009)
 MEGA Cosmos (ECG) (2007 - 2012)
 Mehndi TV (November 28, 2011 - January 2018)
 Movie Central (February 1983 - March 2016)
 MSNBC Canada (September 2001 - December 2004)
 Niagara News TV (February 2011 - April 18, 2011)
 NTV Canada (January 6, 2006 - November 2015)
 Nuevo Mundo (March 13, 2007 - December 1, 2015)
 Persian Vision (unknown — January 2011)
 Radiotélévision des Forces canadiennes
 RTVi+ (November 2004 - November 2009)
 Sens TV (pay-per-view service) (unknown - 2008)
 ShopTV Canada (1996 - 2013)
 Sun News Network (April 18, 2011 - February 13, 2015)
 Sundance Channel (September 7, 2001 - March 1, 2018)
 Talentvision 2 HD (May 23, 2013 - July 2016)
 TATV (1982 - September 2008)
 Télé Achats (November 1, 1995 - August 1, 2012)
 Teletoon Retro (October 1, 2007 - September 1, 2015)
 Télétoon Rétro (September 4, 2008 - September 1, 2015)
 The Ecology Channel
 The Life Channel (October 1985 - November 1986)
 The Pet Network (December 3, 2004 - May 2, 2016)
 Tonis (June 16, 2004 - February 2009)
 TVOne Canada (September 14, 2010 - November 2015)
 TVFQ 99 (September 1979 - August 1988)
 TXT-TV (March 2010 - December 2011)
 UTV Movies (December 2011 - December 2012)
 Viceland (September 7, 2001 - March 31, 2018)
 Video Italia (June 2005 - September 2007)
 Vintage TV (October 2016 - November 2018)
 Viewers Choice (September 1991 - September 2014)
 WTSN (September 2001 - September 2003)
 X-Treme Sports (September 2001 - October 2008)

See also

 List of television stations in Canada by call sign
 List of Canadian television networks
 List of Canadian specialty channels
 Category A services
 Category B services
 Category C services
 List of Quebec television channels
 List of foreign television channels available in Canada
 List of United States stations available in Canada
 Digital television in Canada
 Multichannel television in Canada
 List of Canadian stations available in the United States
 List of television stations in North America by media market
 List of defunct Canadian television stations

External Links
 Streaming Services in Canada: A Consolidated List

References